A bacon sandwich (also known in parts of the United Kingdom and New Zealand as a bacon butty, bacon bap or bacon sarnie, and in parts of Ireland as a rasher sandwich) is a sandwich of cooked bacon between bread that is optionally spread with butter, and may be seasoned with ketchup or brown sauce. It is generally served hot. In some establishments the sandwich will be made from bread toasted on only one side, while other establishments serve it on the same roll as is used for hamburgers.

Bacon sandwiches are an all-day favourite throughout the United Kingdom and the Republic of Ireland. They are often served in British cafes and delis, and are anecdotally recommended as a hangover cure.

Variants
In 2007 researchers at Leeds University evaluated 700 variants of the sandwich, experimenting with different cooking styles, types of bacon, breads, oils, and special additions. Each variant was then ranked by 50 tasters. In conclusion, the best bacon sandwiches are made with "crispy, fried, and not-too-fat bacon between thick slices of white bread."

Another study by the Direct Line for Business listed the top additions to the traditional bacon butty in England. Although the original was still the preferred sandwich, the next top contender was the "breggy" which adds an egg. The next popular accessory was mushrooms, followed by cheese. For sauces, brown sauce was slightly favoured over ketchup. 

The BLT is a popular variant of the bacon sandwich with the additional ingredients of lettuce and tomato, but served cold.

In Ontario, Canada, peameal bacon sandwiches are a common variation, usually served on a soft kaiser bun and are considered the unofficial dish of Toronto.

Double Down

A Double Down is a sandwich offered by Kentucky Fried Chicken (KFC). The Double Down contains "bacon, two different kinds of melted cheese, the Colonel’s 'secret' sauce... pinched in between two pieces of Original Recipe chicken fillets." It is also available with grilled chicken fillets instead of the Original Recipe fried fillets. The KFC Double Down was initially test marketed in Omaha, Nebraska and Providence, Rhode Island. KFC describes the Double Down as a "sandwich" although it does not have bread.

Fool's Gold Loaf

Fool's Gold Loaf is a sandwich made by the Colorado Mine Company, a five-star restaurant in Denver, Colorado. The sandwich consists of a single warmed, hollowed-out loaf of bread filled with one jar of creamy peanut butter, one jar of grape jelly, and a pound of bacon. The name of the sandwich is derived from its price of $49.95.  In later years, it was priced closer to $100 for the sandwich and a bottle of Dom Pérignon.

Health concerns
Numerous studies have showed a connection between processed meats and an increased risk of serious health conditions such as type 2 diabetes, various cancers, and cardiovascular disease.

A study in 2007 conducted by the World Cancer Research Fund found that there was "convincing evidence" of a link between processed meats and an increased chance of cancer. Although no numerical value was provided for the risk, they did state that "people should not eat more than 500g of red meat a week."

The World Health Organization released a warning concerning the sodium content in bacon. For 100g of bacon, there are approximately 1,500 mg of sodium. Currently, the FDA reports that the average American adult should consume less than 2,300 mg per day. Too much sodium in the diet can lead to high blood pressure, which is a major cause of heart disease and stroke.

See also

 Bacon, egg and cheese sandwich
 BLT
 Club sandwich
 Chip butty
 Ed Miliband bacon sandwich photograph
 List of sandwiches
 Peameal bacon sandwiches

References

External links
 

British sandwiches
Irish meat dishes
Bacon sandwiches